Trional (Methylsulfonal) is a sedative-hypnotic and anesthetic drug with GABAergic actions. It has similar effects to sulfonal, except it is faster acting.

History
Trional was prepared and introduced by Eugen Baumann and Alfred Kast in 1888.

Appeared in Agatha Christie's "Murder on the Orient Express", "And Then There Were None" and other novels such as John Bude’s “The Lake District Murder” as a sleep inducing sedative, and in In Search of Lost Time (Sodom and Gomorrah) by Marcel Proust as a hypnotic.  Sax Rohmer also references trional in his novel Dope.

See also
 Sulfonal
 Tetronal

References

Hypnotics
GABAA receptor positive allosteric modulators
Sulfones